Junior Tupou (born 29 July 2002) is a professional rugby league footballer who plays as a er for the Wests Tigers in the NRL.

Background
Tupou was born in New Zealand and raised in Canberra, playing both codes of rugby football.

Career

2022
Tupou made his debut in Round 10 of the 2022 NRL season (Magic Round) for the Tigers against the North Queensland Cowboys, scoring a try in the 13th minute.
Tupou played only four games for the Wests Tigers in the 2022 NRL season as the club finished bottom of the table and claimed the Wooden Spoon for the first time.

References

External links
Wests Tigers profile

2002 births
Living people
Australian rugby league players
Australian sportspeople of Tongan descent
Wests Tigers players
Western Suburbs Magpies NSW Cup players
Rugby league wingers